The District of Columbia State Athletic Association (DCSAA), is the association that oversees post-season high school sporting contests in Washington, D.C. DCSAA is made up of public schools from the DCIAA, DC private schools from various conferences such as the WCAC and the MAC, and DC charter schools. Since the athletic talent in DC is spread out amongst various different leagues, the DCSAA aims to provide a medium for which the best schools, regardless of type, can compete under unified rules. That way, there can be a true city champion, rather than a public school champion and private school champions.

The DCSAA sponsors championships in football, basketball, soccer, cross country, cheerleading, baseball, indoor track, outdoor track, softball, golf, lacrosse, tennis, wrestling, swimming, chess, ultimate frisbee and volleyball.

Member High Schools
A mix of public, parochial, charter, and independent schools are members of the DCSAA.

Charter schools

Diocesan schools

Independent schools

Public

Champions 
Source:

Baseball 
2013- Maret School
2014- St. John's College High School
2015- Gonzaga College High School
2016- St. Albans
2017- Gonzaga College High School
2018- Woodrow Wilson High School
2019- St. John's College High School

Men's Basketball 
2013- Coolidge Senior High School
2014- Theodore Roosevelt Senior High School
2015- St. John's College High School
2016- H.D. Woodson Senior High School
2017- Gonzaga College High School
2018- Woodrow Wilson High School
2019- Sidwell Friends School (AA), KIPP College Prep (A)

Women's Basketball 
2013- H.D. Woodson Senior High School
2014- St. John's College High School
2015- Georgetown Visitation Preparatory School
2016- St. John's College High School
2017- St. John's College High School
2018- St. John's College High School
2019- St. John's College High School (AA), Eastern High School (A)
2022- Sidwell Friends School

Chess 
2015- St. Anselm's Abbey School
2016- Sidwell Friends
2019- St. Albans

Men's Cross Country 
2012- Sidwell Friends
2013- Georgetown Day School
2014- Sidwell Friends
2015- Sidwell Friends
2016- Gonzaga College High School
2017- Gonzaga College High School
2018- Gonzaga College High School
2019- Gonzaga College High School

Women's Cross Country 
2012- Sidwell Friends
2013- Georgetown Visitation Preparatory School
2014- Georgetown Visitation Preparatory School
2015- Georgetown Day School
2016- Georgetown Visitation Preparatory School
2017- St. John's College High School
2018- Woodrow Wilson High School
2019- St. John's College High School

Football 
2012- Friendship Collegiate Academy Public Charter School
2013- H.D. Woodson Senior High School
2014- Gonzaga College High School
2015- Gonzaga College High School
2016- Friendship Collegiate Academy Public Charter School
2017- Ballou High School (AA), Theodore Roosevelt Senior High School (A)
2018- Friendship Collegiate Academy Public Charter School (AA)

Men's Indoor Track 
2013- Gonzaga College High School
2014- Gonzaga College High School
2015- St. John's College High School
2016- Gonzaga College High School
2017- Gonzaga College High School
2018- St. John's College High School
2019- Gonzaga College High School

Women's Indoor Track 
2013- Woodrow Wilson High School
2014- Dunbar High School
2015- Georgetown Visitation Preparatory School
2016- Woodrow Wilson High School
2017- Woodrow Wilson High School
2018- St. John's College High School
2019- St. John's College High School

Men's Outdoor Track 
2013- HD Woodson Senior High School
2014- Georgetown Day School
2015- Georgetown Day School
2016- Georgetown Day School
2017- Woodrow Wilson High School
2018- Archbishop Carroll High School
2019- Sidwell Friends School

Women's Outdoor Track 
2013- Dunbar High School
2014- Woodrow Wilson High School
2015- Dunbar High School
2016- Georgetown Day School
2017- Woodrow Wilson High School
2018- Dunbar High School
2019- St. John's College High School

Men's Soccer 
2012- St. Albans
2013- Sidwell Friends
2014- Gonzaga College High School
2015- St. Albans
2016- Washington International School
2017- Gonzaga College High School
2018- St. John's College High School
2019- Gonzaga College High School

Women's Soccer 
2012- National Cathedral School
2013- National Cathedral School
2014- National Cathedral School
2015- Woodrow Wilson High School
2016- St. John's College High School
2017- St. John's College High School
2018- Sidwell Friends School
2019- St. John's College High School

Softball 
2013- National Cathedral School
2014- National Cathedral School
2015- Georgetown Visitation Preparatory School
2016- National Cathedral School
2017- National Cathedral School
2018- National Cathedral School
2019- National Cathedral School

Men's Tennis 
2017- Maret School
2018- Sidwell Friends
2019- Sidwell Friends

Women's Tennis 
2017- National Cathedral School
2018- Sidwell Friends
2019- Sidwell Friends

Volleyball 
2013- St. John's College High School
2014- St. John's College High School
2015- St. John's College High School
2016- St. John's College High School
2017- St. John's College High School
2018- St. John's College High School
2019- St. John's College High School

Ultimate Frisbee 
2015- Woodrow Wilson High School
2016- Woodrow Wilson High School
2017- Woodrow Wilson High School
2018- Woodrow Wilson High School
2019- Woodrow Wilson High School

References

External links
 

High school sports conferences and leagues in Washington, D.C.